Hastula escondida is a species of sea snail, a marine gastropod mollusc in the family Terebridae, the auger snails.

Description
The length of the shell attains 61 mm.

Distribution
This marine species occurs off Madagascar.

References

External links

 Terryn Y. 2006. Impages escondida n. sp., a new terebra from southern Madagascar - with a revision of the Madagascar Impages. Club Conchylia Informationen, 38(1-2): 48-50
 Fedosov, A. E.; Malcolm, G.; Terryn, Y.; Gorson, J.; Modica, M. V.; Holford, M.; Puillandre, N. (2020). Phylogenetic classification of the family Terebridae (Neogastropoda: Conoidea). Journal of Molluscan Studies. 85(4): 359-388

Terebridae
Gastropods described in 2006